Steve Dugardein (born 28 January 1974 in Mouscron, Belgium) is a Belgian former professional footballer who played as a midfielder.

References

External links

1974 births
Living people
People from Mouscron
Belgian footballers
Royal Excel Mouscron players
Ligue 1 players
Stade Malherbe Caen players
Oud-Heverlee Leuven players
Belgian expatriate footballers
Expatriate footballers in France
Association football midfielders
Footballers from Hainaut (province)